Bahar (Persian: بهار; DMG: Bahār; English: "Spring") was a Persian-language magazine founded in Tehran in 1910 by Mirza Yusof Khan Ashtiani, a Persian poet and journalist. It was published monthly in two volumes (April 1910– October 1911 and April 1921–December 1922) in 17 or 16 editions.

About 
At the beginning the publisher aimed to provide a forum for literary, scholarly, historical and political exchanges, as well as for the spread of information. The published articles were primarily written or translated by E'tesam-al-Molk himself. Editor-in-chief of the first volume was Mirza Reza Khan Modabber-al-Mamalek, the later editor of Tamaddon (1920). Abbas Khalili, who also published  newspaper (1921), acted as editor-in-chief of the second volume. 

Under Khalili, the publication of literary topics and translations of European literature increased. Well-known examples include works of Victor Hugo and Rousseau as well as Lermontov's "Demon". Discussions of contemporary Persian literature and literary criticism became increasingly popular among readers.

References

External links
 Online-Version: Bahār

1910 establishments in Iran
1922 disestablishments in Iran
Defunct magazines published in Iran
Defunct political magazines
Monthly magazines published in Iran
Magazines established in 1910
Magazines disestablished in 1922
Magazines published in Tehran
Persian-language magazines
Qajar Iran